Darrington is a civil parish in the metropolitan borough of the City of Wakefield, West Yorkshire, England.  The parish contains 16 listed buildings that are recorded in the National Heritage List for England.  Of these, one is listed at Grade I, the highest of the three grades, and the others are at Grade II, the lowest grade.  The parish contains the villages of Darrington and Wentbridge and the surrounding countryside.  The listed buildings consist of houses and associated structures, two churches and items in the churchyard of the older church, a farmhouse, farm buildings, a former windmill, a former school, a bridge and a viaduct, a guide post, and a milestone.


Key

Buildings

References

Citations

Sources

 

Lists of listed buildings in West Yorkshire